Failure of Engineer Garin (translit. Krakh inzhenera Garina) is a 1973 Soviet television film in four parts loosely based on a novel Hyperboloid of Engineer Garin by Alexei Tolstoy.  Produced by Lenfilm by the order of Gosteleradio of USSR

Plot summary
A Russian engineer Petr Garin possesses a unique beam-shooting weapon that can destroy any target on practically any distance. Staging his death he emigrates from Russia as a French merchant and tries to find contacts with the head of one of the largest financial trusts in Europe, Mr. Rolling. The final goal of Garin is to rule the world.

Cast
 Oleg Borisov as Pyotr Garin
 Aleksandr Belyavskiy as Vasili Shelga
 Vasili Korzun as Rolling
 Nonna Terentyeva as Zoe Montrose
 Vladimir Tatosov as Tyklinski
 Mikhail Volkov as Sсhefer
 Alexander Kaidanovsky as Dr. Wolf
 Grigori Gaj as Reicher
 Anatoli Shvedersky as Ditz
 Algimantas Masiulis as Sсhtufen
 Igor Kuznetsov as doctor
 Valentin Nikulin as Portier
 Yefim Kopelyan as Gaston, the 'Duck Nose'
 Vitali Yushkov as Arnoud
 Gediminas Karka as episode
 Aleksandr Demyanenko as episode
 Vladimr Kostin as Investigator
 Ernst Romanov as Khlynov
 Gennady Saifulin as Victor Lenoir

External links

1973 television films
1973 films
Soviet television films
Lenfilm films
1970s Russian-language films
Soviet science fiction films
1970s science fiction films